Are You Afraid of the Dark? is a book series that is based on the television series of the same name. This book series was created in 1995. The first book was written by John Peel, who later wrote three more books in the series.

Only two books from the series, The Tale of Cutter's Treasure and The Tale of the Nightly Neighbors, were actually adapted from episodes of the TV series, and each has the same title as the episode on which it was based.

The first six books in the series have covers that are illustrated with a single photo of the face of a surprised or frightened child. (The one exception to this is the cover of book number two, The Tale of Cutter's Treasure, as in addition to the photo of a child's frightened face, it also includes stills from the TV episode on which the book is based.) The covers of the later books follow a completely different style and layout, with each featuring an illustration that is directly related to the story within.

List of books in the series
The Tale of the Sinister Statues: Siblings Dustin and Brianne suspect strange goings-on at the local museum after one of their friends and the class bully vanish.
The Tale of Cutter's Treasure: Adaptation of the episode of the same name. Russ must save his younger brother Max after he’s captured by the spirit of villainous pirate captain Jonas Cutter.
The Tale of the Restless House: A planned prank goes wrong when the mastermind engineering it goes missing, and his intended target, Adam, and his group of friends find themselves trapped in the infamous Hawkins House.
The Tale of the Nightly Neighbors: Adapted from the episode of the same name. Siblings Emma and Dayday suspect their new neighbors might be vampires.
The Tale of the Secret Mirror: An attempt to scare her pesky little brother goes wrong when Kim is transported into the world behind the mirror in their attic.
The Tale of the Phantom School Bus: Joey finds himself being stalked by a haunted school bus.
The Tale of the Ghost Riders: Josh and his new friend Carlos find themselves in trouble when they follow a skin-walker to his cave.
The Tale of the Deadly Diary: Hoping to finally keep her little sister from reading her new diary, courtesy of Dr. Vink, Elizabeth writes down that if Karen reads it, goblins will come for her. Karen ignores the warning....and it soon comes true.....
The Tale of the Virtual Nightmare: Cady learns a new horror of video game addiction when her friend Sam becomes addicted to a new computer game he refuses to show anyone....and then vanishes....
The Tale of the Curious Cat: Overly curious Natalie unintentionally sets off a chain of events that kills a black cat. And now she's going to help it come back from the dead.
The Tale of the Zero Hero: Simon's family moves back into their old house, which no one Simon tells believes is haunted by the ghost of his great-grandfather, a supposed coward from World War I. But then the ghost transports Simon back to those days to change history.
The Tale of the Shimmering Shell: In a fit of anger, Glynnis wishes her father, step-mother, and step-brother would leave her alone....and summons an evil force that makes her wish reality....
The Tale of the Three Wishes: Duncan is given a wish-granting comic. And learns that wishes often come with a price....
The Tale of the Campfire Vampires: Two cousins on a canoe trip in Maine disturb an ancient cairn and release imprisoned wendigos.
The Tale of the Bad-Tempered Ghost: Danny is being framed for messes by a ghost.
The Tale of the Souvenir Shop: Sisters Emily and Juliana learn a new meaning to "buyer beware" when they find a mysterious souvenir shop.
The Tale of the Ghost Cruise: While on a cruise on his great-uncle's yacht, Norris meets a girl named Merle who claims there's a ghost on board.
The Tale of the Pulsating Gate: Scott Fong discovers the dangers of alternate dimensions.
The Tale of the Stalking Shadow: Hadley Heering has found a haunted house and wanted to come face-to-face with a supernatural presence that begins haunting her.
The Tale of the Egyptian Mummies: Annie and Laura find themselves up against two reanimated mummies.
The Tale of the Terrible Toys: Carter learns that the toys in his attic are alive. And later, that they might not be as friendly as they appear....
The Tale of the Mogul Monster: Snowboarding heir Dee gets separated from his group. And he's not alone...
The Tale of the Horrifying Hockey Team: John and his hockey team go up against a team of the undead.

References

American horror novels
Are You Afraid of the Dark?
Books based on television series
Book series introduced in 1995
Horror novel series